The Trekking Xenos is a family of French single-place and two-place paragliders that was designed and produced by Trekking Parapentes of Lambesc. Introduced in 2003, the line is now out of production.

Design and development
The Xenos was designed as a beginner glider, with a two-place version for flight training. The models are each named for their relative size.

Operational history
Reviewer Noel Bertrand described the Xenos in a 2003 review as, "a forgiving wing for the beginner."

Variants
Xenos S
Small-sized model for lighter pilots. The glider model is AFNOR Standard certified.
Xenos M
Mid-sized model for medium-weight pilots. The glider model is AFNOR Standard certified.
Xenos L
Large-sized model for heavier pilots. The glider model is AFNOR Standard certified.
Xenos XL Bi
Extra large-sized model for two people in tandem for flight training and as such was referred to as the Xenos XL Bi, indicating "bi-place" or two seater. The glider model is AFNOR Biplace certified.

Specifications (Xenos M)

References

Xenos
Paragliders